Toxicon is a peer-reviewed scientific journal of toxinology and the official journal of the International Society on Toxinology and the North American Society of Toxinology. It is published by Elsevier and the editor-in-chief is Ray Norton. It aims to publish original research, novel findings, and review papers on toxins and their chemical, toxicological, pharmacological, and immunological properties.

The journal was established in 1962. According to the Journal Citation Reports, Toxicon has a 2020 impact factor of 3.033.

References

External links
 

Publications established in 1962
Elsevier academic journals
English-language journals
Toxicology journals
Pharmacology journals